Wajid Ali may refer to:

 Wajid Ali Shah (1822–1887), tenth and last Nawab of the Kingdom of Awadh (Oudh)
 Wajid Ali (Indian cricketer) (born 2000), Indian cricketer
 Wajid Ali (Pakistani cricketer) (born 1981), Pakistani cricketer
 Wajid Ali (musician singer), part of the Hindi music composer duo Sajid–Wajid
 Wajid Ali (kabaddi) (born 1984), Pakistani kabaddi player
 S. Wajid Ali (1890–1951), Bengali writer and nationalist
 Syed Wajid Ali (1911–2008), industrialist of Pakistan who is also known for his services to the Olympic Movement

See also
Wajid (name)
Ali (disambiguation)